The Parliament of Catalonia is the unicameral legislature of the autonomous community of Catalonia, Spain. The Parliament is currently made up of 135 members, known as deputies (diputats/deputats/diputados), who are elected for four-year terms or after extraordinary dissolution, chosen by universal suffrage in lists of four constituencies, corresponding to the Catalan provinces. The Parliament building is located in Ciutadella Park, Barcelona.

Established in 1932, after the grant of self-government to Catalonia by the Second Spanish Republic, it went to exile in 1939 as a consequence of the Nationalist victory in the Spanish Civil War. It was reestablished in 1979 during the transition to democracy. The most recent general election to the Parliament was held on 14 February 2021.

Historical background

Catalan Courts

The first representative and legislative bodies in Catalonia were the Comital Court (Catalan: Cort Comtal) of Barcelona, modelling after the Frankish curia regis, and the Peace and Truce of God Assemblies (Assemblees de Pau i Treva), of which the earliest record dates from 1027. The last ones were originally ad hoc, local meetings convened by the clergy (Oliba, Bishop of Vic, who died in 1046, was a notable instigator) but progressively became subsumed into the court of the Counts of Barcelona. The first Catalan legal code, the Usatges de Barcelona, was promulgated by Count Ramon Berenguer I based on the decisions of these assemblies.

Although the counts of Barcelona, had greatly extended the territory under their control, their financial and military power was quite limited, due to the impact of the Feudal revolution during the regency of countess Ermesinde of Carcassonne (1018-1044). Their personal resources were particularly insufficient in periods of economic crisis or military expansion, of which they were many from the twelfth to the fifteenth centuries. The need to secure troops and revenue led to the steady expansion of the Count's Court (Royal Court after the dynastic union of Barcelona and the Kingdom of Aragon, creating the Crown of Aragon) and a formalisation of its procedures. It came to be referred to as the Cort General de Catalunya or Corts catalanes (General Court of Catalonia or Catalan Courts), and was endowed with formal procedures, effectively written constitutions, by King Peter III of Aragon in 1283, making this institution the policemaking and legislative body of the Principality of Catalonia.

The Corts Catalanes were summoned and presided by the king as count of Barcelona, being composed of Three Estates (Tres Braços), representing the clergy, the feudal nobles and the citizens of Royal towns such as Barcelona or Girona. Inhabitants of feudal towns (such as Cardona) were not represented, except by their overlords. The main function of the Corts was legislative, either in approving laws proposed by the monarch (Constitucions) or at their own initiative (capítols de cort). Although the Catalan Courts met at irregular intervals, it also formally approved the acts of the between the King and their sessions (known as pragmàtiques) and, from 1359, established a permanent delegation to oversee the Crown (the Deputation of the General, forerunner of the Generalitat de Catalunya). The Catalan Courts, as well as the other institutions of the Principality and the administrative use of Catalan language, were abolished by the Nueva Planta decrees in 1716 after the House of Bourbon, supported by the Crown of Castille, defeated the Habsburg pretender to throne, which was backed by the remnants of the Crown of Aragon in the War of the Spanish Succession.

Modern history

First proposals of a Catalan assembly
There were attempts from late 19th century to restore an autonomous system of representation for Catalonia. The Manresa Bases (1892) proposed the creation of new Catalan Courts, partly modeled on the original ones. On the other hand, republican federalists and left-wing Catalan nationalists made their own proposals of a liberal and democratic Catalan assembly. The first achievement of Catalan nationalism (led at that time by the Regionalist League), the Commonwealth of Catalonia (1914–25), was an institution composed by the provincial councils (diputaciones) of Barcelona, Girona, Lleida and Tarragona, which included a general assembly made up by representatives from the four provinces, but lacking legislative powers. In 1919, the Commonwealth prepared a project of Statute of Autonomy for Catalonia which included a bicameral parliament, however, the bill wasn't implemented. The assembly and the Commonwealth itself were disbanded and outlawed by Miguel Primo de Rivera's dictatorship in 1925.

Republic and Generalitat
Following a brief proclamation of the Catalan Republic on 14 April 1931 and the provisional establishment of the Generalitat as a Catalan government within the new Spanish Republic, the first Statute of Autonomy of Catalonia was approved by the Spanish Parliament in September 1932, recognizing Catalan self-government and establishing a separate Parliament of Catalonia as the legislative body of the Generalitat, being elected on 20 November 1932. This first legislature was control by the Republican Left of Catalonia (Esquerra Republicana de Catalunya, ERC), which won the absolute majority of seats, while the conservative Regionalist League, almost hegemonic in Catalonia during the reign of Alfonso XIII, reached the second place but far from the Republican Left. Lluís Companys was appointed the first speaker of the Parliament. The Parliament appointed the ERC leader, Francesc Macià, as president of the Generalitat and, right after the election, the institution began to pass progressive legislation in different areas, such as health, culture and civil law, however, the institution was suspended between 1934 and 1936 when the Government of Catalonia attempted to create a Catalan State after, among other reasons, a bill to change the taxing of farmers was rejected by the Constitutional Court. The unilateral declaration of sovereignty lasted 10 hours. 

The Parliament and the government were restored in February 1936 after the victory of Popular Front in the Spanish election, and abolished by the dictator Francisco Franco at the beginning of the occupation of Catalonia during the Spanish Civil War. The Parliament of Catalonia, like the rest of the institutions of the Generalitat, went to exile in 1939.

Restablishment
After the death of Franco in 1975 and the subsequent first years of Spanish transition to democracy, claims by most of Catalan society and political spectrum, from communists to liberals, to restore self-government grew. the Generalitat came back from exile in 1977. In 1979, the new Statute of Autonomy of Catalonia recognized the restoration of the Parliament. The first legislature of the current Parliament of Catalonia was elected on 20 March 1980, 48 years after the first election in 1932. Convergència i Unió (CiU) a center-right Catalan nationalist electoral coalition won the plurality of seats, reaching 48 of 135 seats, and thus giving the presidency of the Generalitat to its leader Jordi Pujol, a position he would hold until 2003. That began a period of hegemony of CiU, which won the election of 1984 with an absolute majority (72 of 135).

Building
The official home of Parliament is the Palace of the Parliament of Catalonia (Palau del Parlament de Catalunya in Catalan). It is located in the Parc de la Ciutadella of the capital city, Barcelona. The main entrance is at number 1 of Joan Fiveller Square.

The building was designed by the Flemish architect Jorge Próspero de Verboom between 1716 and 1748 to serve as an arsenal, in the fortress of the Citadel that King Philip V had built, shortly after having conquered the city of Barcelona, ​​on 11 September 1714. After the destruction of the Citadel, in 1868, the old arsenal was converted into a palace by the architect Pere Falqués, in order to receive the royal family during the 1888 Barcelona Universal Exposition. In 1900, the building became the Local Museum of Decorative and Archaeological Arts (Museo Municipal de Arte Decorativo y Arqueológico in Spanish).

In 1932, after the proclamation of the Second Spanish Republic and the grant of self-government to Catalonia, the building was chosen by the newly created Catalan Parliament. The building was renovated by the decorator Santiago Marco, transforming the throne room into the session chamber, and on the facade the Bourbon coat of arms  was replaced by the Blazon of Catalonia. The inaugural session was held on 6 December 1932. After the Civil War, the building became a military barracks and in 1945, the seat of the Museum of Modern Art of Barcelona.

In 1977, during the Spanish transition to democracy, the building temporarily served as the Assembly of Parliamentarians (Catalan: Assemblea de Parlamentaris) until the restitution of Catalan self-government. In 1979 it became the seat of Parliament again and was renovated. Finally, the Museum of Modern Art was transferred in 2004 to the National Palace of Montjuïc, the new headquarters of the National Art Museum of Catalonia. Since then, the palace has been used exclusively for parliamentary purposes.

It is now listed as a Cultural asset of local interest (Bé cultural d'interès local in Catalan) in the Inventory of Catalan Cultural Heritage, with the number 08019/125.

Functions
The definition and functions of the Parliament of Catalonia are defined by the Title II, Chapter I of the Statute of Autonomy. According to the Statute, the Parliament:

 Elects the President of the Generalitat de Catalunya.
 Pass the Catalan legislation in the business of its competence.
 Pass the Budget of the Autonomous Community of Catalonia.
 Controls the action of the Government of Catalonia and the autonomous agencies, public companies and all other bodies answerable to it.
 Elects the Síndic de Greuges (ombudsman).
 Elects eight senators who represent Catalonia in the Senate of Spain.
 Elaborates bills to present them to the Bureau of the Congress of Deputies and appoints the deputies of the Parliament in charge of defending them.
 Requests the adoption of bills from the Government of the State.
 Requests to the State the transfer or delegation of powers and the attribution of powers within the framework of article 150 of the Constitution.
 Appeals of unconstitutionality before the Constitutional Court and in other constitutional proceedings, in accordance with the provisions of the Organic Law of the Constitutional Court.
 Exercises other functions attributed to it by the Statute and the laws.

Gallery

References

Bibliography 
 Morales Montoya, Mercè (2012): El Parlament de Catalunya: república, guerra Civil i exili, Barcelona. Base, 2012.

External links

 Official website (multilingual, mostly in Catalan)
 

 
1932 establishments in Catalonia
Catalonia
Catalonia